Svenstavik is a locality and the seat of Berg Municipality in Jämtland County, Sweden with 1,004 inhabitants in 2010.

European route E45 passes through Svenstavik, and County Road 321 (länsväg 321)  begins here and ends at Mattmar in Åre. Inland Line (Swedish: Inlandsbanan) rail line arrived in the area during  the 1910s. The Svenstavik–Brunflo line opened during 1917 and Svenstavik–Åsarna line in 1918.

Svenstavik is mostly famoose for Älghälga. Älghälga is a festival to celebrate the start of moose hunting.

References 

Populated places in Berg Municipality
Municipal seats of Jämtland County
Jämtland
Swedish municipal seats